Nəsimi may refer to:

 Nəsimi, Bilasuvar, Azerbaijan
 Nəsimi, Sabirabad, Azerbaijan
 Nəsimi raion, a settlement and raion of Baku, Azerbaijan

See also
 Nasimi (disambiguation), including uses of Nesimi